Esmailabad (also Romanized as Esmā‘īlābād; also known as  Khorkhoreh) is a village in Hesar-e Valiyeasr Rural District, Central District, Avaj County, Qazvin Province, Iran. At the 2006 Census, its population was 158, in 44 families.

Esmailabad suffered severely in the 2002 Bou'in-Zahra earthquake.

References 

Populated places in Avaj County